{{Automatic taxobox
| taxon = Tonnoidea
| image = Cabestana spengleri.jpg
| image_caption = A live but retracted individual of Cabestana spengleri, a species in the Ranellidae
| authority = Suter, 1913 (1825)
| synonyms_ref = 
| synonyms = Cassoidea (junior synonym)
| subdivision_ranks = Families
| subdivision = See text
}}

The Tonnoidea are a superfamily of sea snails, marine gastropod molluscs  in the order Littorinimorpha. This superfamily includes many very large species.

Nomenclature
Beu (1998, 2008) favours usage of Tonnoidea and Tonnidae rather than Cassoidea and Cassidae preferred by Riedel (1995). This is in agreement with the action of Thiele (1925) who placed Tonnidae and Cassidae under "stirps Tonnacea", therefore acting as first reviser under ICZN art. 24

Families
Families within the superfamily Tonnoidea include:
 Bursidae, the frog shells
 Cassidae, the helmet shells and bonnet shells
 Charoniidae
 Cymatiidae
 Laubierinidae
 Personidae
 Ranellidae, the tritons
 Thalassocyonidae
 Tonnidae, the tun shells
Families brought into synonymy
 Aquillidae Pilsbry, 1904: synonym of Cymatiinae Iredale, 1913 (1854)
 Distorsioninae Beu, 1981: synonym of Personidae Gray, 1854
 Doliidae Latreille, 1825: synonym of Tonnidae Suter, 1913 (1825)
 Galeodoliidae Sacco, 1891: synonym of Tonnidae Suter, 1913 (1825)
 Lampusiidae Newton, 1891: synonym of Cymatiinae Iredale, 1913 (1854)
 Lotoriidae Harris, 1897: synonym of Cymatiinae Iredale, 1913 (1854)
 Macgillivrayiidae H. Adams & A. Adams, 1854: synonym of Tonnidae Suter, 1913 (1825)
 Nyctilochidae Dall, 1912: synonym of Cymatiinae Iredale, 1913 (1854)
 Oocorythidae P. Fischer, 1885: synonym of Cassidae Latreille, 1825
 Personinae Gray, 1854: synonym of Personidae Gray, 1854 (original rank)
 Septidae Dall & Simpson, 1901: synonym of Cymatiinae Iredale, 1913 (1854)
 Simpulidae Dautzenberg, 1900: synonym of Cymatiinae Iredale, 1913 (1854)
 Tritoniidae H. Adams & A. Adams, 1853: synonym of Ranellidae Gray, 1854 (Invalid: type genus a junior homonym of Tritonium O.F. Müller, 1776. Also homonym of Tritoniidae Lamarck, 1809 based on Tritonia Cuvier, 1797)

References

 Millard, V. (1996). Classification of Mollusca: a classification of world wide Mollusca''. Victor G. Millard: Rhine Road, South Africa. . 544 pp

External links
 
 Strong E.E., Puillandre N., Beu A.G., Castelin M. & Bouchet P. (2019). Frogs and tuns and tritons – A molecular phylogeny and revised family classification of the predatory gastropod superfamily Tonnoidea (Caenogastropoda). Molecular Phylogenetics and Evolution. 130: 18-34

 
Gastropod superfamilies